Kimaka is a neighborhood in the city of Jinja, in the Eastern Region of Uganda.

Location
Kimaka is bordered by to the west by the Nile River, (from Nalubaale Power Station to Bujagali Power Station), to the south by the Kampala-Jinja Highway (from Nalubaale Power Station to the first roundabout as one enters Jinja from Kampala), to the east by Qaddafi Barracks and to the north by the area north of the Jinja Airport. The coordinates of Kimaka are:0°27'01.0"N, 33°11'30.0"E (Latitude:0.450278; Longitude:33.191667).

Overview

Kimaka is divided into the Eastern Zone, east of the Jinja-Budondo Road, and the Western Zone, to the west of that road. The Eastern Zone is dominated by Jinja Airport and the Uganda Senior Command and Staff College. The Western Zone is primarily composed of middle class residential neighborhoods and, closer to the River Nile, by the three hydroelectric dams from south to north: Nalubaale, Kiira, and Bujagali. Kimaka Power Station, a 50 MW thermal power plant that uses heavy fuel oil, is located adjacent to Kiira Power Station.

Landmarks
The landmarks in Kimaka or near its borders include:

 Jinja Airport, a military and civilian airport that serves Jinja
 Uganda Senior Command and Staff College, located adjacent to the airport
 Nalubaale Power Station located at the southwestern border of Kimaka
 Kiira Power Station located at the southwestern border of Kimaka, adjacent to Nalubaale Power Station
 Victoria Nile - Forms the western border of Kimaka
 The Jinja-Budondo Road - Bisects Kimaka into the Eastern and Western Zones
 Kimaka Power Station - A thermal power station operated by Invespro, a private power company
 The Kampala-Jinja Highway - The highway forms the southern border of the neighbourhood

See also
 Jinja District
 Njeru
 Military of Uganda
 List of power stations in Uganda

References

External links
 Jinja Airport to Undergo Improvements

Populated places in Eastern Region, Uganda
Cities in the Great Rift Valley
Populated places on the Nile
Jinja District